The University of Jaén (Spanish:UJA; Universidad de Jaén; Latin: Universitas Giennensis) is a public research university based in Jaén, Andalucía, Spain.

Founded by the Andalusian Parliament through Act 05/1993 (BOE-A-1993-21945) in 1993 with the stated mission to promulgate and educate future generations of economists, health professionals, engineers and scientists.

It's appraised as the successor of the ancient University of Baeza, established in 1538 by Pope Paul III in the former Kingdom of Jaén.

Considered part of the University of Granada up until its formal creation, the research institution inherits some of the research and development centres and experimental sciences laboratories. In addition to the principal campus, Lagunillas Campus, the university has two satellite environments, the Scientific-Technological Campus in Linares and the "Sagrada Familia" learning facility in Úbeda. Currently under construction is the Advanced Clinical Simulation Center.

According to the Times Higher Education Impact Rankings published in 2021, the institution remains as one of the 100 best universities to adhere to the United Nations’ Sustainable Development Goals highlighting research, stewardship, outreach and teaching.

History 
Jaén University traces its history back to the Modern Age with the University of Baeza and throughout the 17th century, in the brief period when the General Study of Santa Catalina became a Pontifical University.

The 14th century to the 16th century

Earlier in 1368, there was a Grammar School which in addition to teaching the discipline, it taught Rhetoric, Logic and all the Liberal Arts. When in the late Modern Age there was a significant economic enrichment, the strength of urban centres like Úbeda, Baeza, Andujar, Alcalá la Real and Jaén itself, this together with the political situation, made the possibility of the realization of a university a reality. King Juan I of Castilla, in 1382, founded the Convent School of Santa Catalina Martyr, run by the Order of Santo Domingo, which taught liberal arts and theology.

Thanks to the efforts of Knight twenty-four Mr Juan Cerezo, Pope Paul III, in 1503, issued a bull which empowered the General Study of the Convent of Santa Catalina to study Liberal Arts, Medicine, Theology and other sciences.

In 1585 the Augustinians, with the complicity of some members of the Cathedral Chapter and without the permission of Bishop Francisco Sarmiento de Mendoza, tried to establish a College of Letters, like that of Baeza, which was created in 1538; but the strong opposition from the Bishop and certain canons, committed to the University of Baeza, caused the university to fail.

The 17th century up to the start of the 20th century 

In 1629, Pope Urban VIII, issued a bull which converted the General Survey of the Convent of Santa Catalina Martyr into the Pontifical University of Baeza. This initiated a lawsuit, which they won the following year, the result of which Jaén ceased to be the host university.

The main university was in Baeza, founded on the above date by notary Rodrigo López, who was a relative of Pope Paul III. The school had early support from important noblemen, so-called New Christians—bourgeois Jews who had converted to Christianity rather than leave Spain - as well as from the Jesuits and the Carmelites; Saint John of the cross participated in prayer seminars there. From the very beginning the faculties of Arts and Theology existed, and in 1683, the Canon was founded. Eventually, the University of Baeza went into a long decline, as a result of historical events, which characterised the province of Jaén. The province became an increasingly rural backwater, a pattern that continued until quite recent times. The local aristocracy left, to Parliament in Madrid or to other major Spanish cities, where they invested their wealth, rather than in Jaén and Baeza. The textile industry that had been the basis of local wealth went into a particular decline. Teaching at the university ossified, and an 1807 decree abolished the university, which was followed by the definitive end of the university in 1824.

From then on, the university demands would be made by two centres which were founded in Jaén in 1843: the teacher training college and the Secondary School. Colleges which without being fully recognised are now closer to the status of University Colleges. The mining industry kept its aspirations and the industrial bourgeoisie led to the founding of the School of Mining in 1892 in Linares. Some years later also in Linares, the Linares Industrial School was founded by Royal Decree on July 16, 1910, where they taught the Industrial Technical studies: Mechanical, Chemical, Electrical, and Construction engineering. In 1911 the Technical Middle School, providing Electrical and Mechanical Specialist qualifications and in 1913 the Teacher Training College, were both founded in Jaén.

The 20th century to the 21st century 
A new qualitative and quantitative leap occurred from 1945 with the teaching of Business Studies in the School of Commerce. In 1951 came the reopening of the Expert Technical School of Jaén, in Linares, which had closed in 1937 because of the Civil War; however, remained open during the war, and returned to normal during 1939/40, after the end of the war. A second Teacher Training College, the "Sagrada Familia" was founded in 1949 in Villanueva del Arzobispo, where it remained until 1949 when it was transferred to Úbeda. In 1954 Jaén Provincial Council founded the Provincial Welfare School of Nursing.

Around the seventies, the demographic and political model that favoured the dispersion of the university through the founding of University Colleges, created an ideal environment for the Academic Activities Seminar organized in 1969 within the Institute of Jaén Studies, regaining the university project in Jaén. In April 1970 Jaén Council authorized the necessary funds for the founding of a college. Requested by the council in July 1971, it was granted by the Ministry of Education and Science in October of that year. However, until November 1975 it was not affiliated to the University of Granada.

Earlier in 1972, the School of Education had become the Teacher Training College of the EGB (Educación General Básica, the old Spanish education system) and the School of Technical Industrial Engineering became the College of Technical Industrial Engineering. In 1976 the Linares Technical College, suffered the same fate, also joining the group of University Centres in the province of Jaén a new municipal ownership of the same city, as was the School of Teacher Training "Antonia López Arista." Finally in 1978 the School of Commerce, which would be the School of Business Studies, the School of Nursing and the "Sagrada Familia" Úbeda joined the rest of the group which made up the schools in Jaén and the provinces.

In 1982 the college joined the University of Granada, although the effective integration did not take place until January 1985.

The penultimate stage of the process occurred after 1989. In that year the University College was broken down into the Faculty of Humanities and the Faculty of Experimental Science. In 1990 the Faculty of Social Sciences and Law was founded. The year before the University School of Industrial Engineering of Jaén became the Technical College and the University of Granada founded the University Campus University in Jaén, to which the existing centres in the city were first affiliated. From the academic year 92/93 those in the rest of the province also joined.

1993, founding of the University of Jaén 

The final stage began after the founding of the Academic Technical Committee Jaén University Campus. Then in May 1992 was the final transformation into University of Jaén, by Law 5 / 1993 of the Andalusian Parliament of July 1, 1993, which officially began with the constitution of the Management Committee on 7 September of that year.

At this stage, all existing university centres in Jaén, and the rest of the province form the new University of Jaén, in which Mr Luis Parras Guijosa will be the first vice-chancellor (previously president of the Management Committee).

The new university continues growing, the Linares Technical College, which has been giving training to professionals of mining and industrial engineering for over 100 years. During 93-94 it added technical engineering studies for telecommunications (Telematics) to its range of training. This institution belongs to the University of Jaén. Some years later, in 2005 and after establishing the second year of Telecommunication Engineering studies, the Linares Technical College acquired a superior status.

The Statutes of the University of Jaén, as a tool for self-government, were approved by the Constitutional Senate on the 9th of June 1998 and subsequently by the Governing Council of the Autonomous Community of Andalucía, through Decree 277/1998 of 22 December, as published in the Official Gazette of the Autonomous Community of Andalucía, no. 8 January 19, 1999.

Once all the requirements were fulfilled as required under current legislation, the University of Jaén was fully integrated into the Spanish university system and able to fully exercise the autonomy conferred by Article 27.10 from the Spanish Constitution of 1978.

Since it was founded, the institution has committed itself to providing quality teaching, as well as the increase of scientific production and development of infrastructures (currently there are several under construction). The University of Jaén offers of over 50 degrees, technical equipment of advanced technology, laboratories, a library with more than 480,000 digital publications, exchange programs and mobility for students within more than 60 countries, work experience with more than 550 companies, a careers service with two programs of professional training and modern sports facilities as well as a wide range of activities for students.

Future prospects 
The University of Jaén is at its peak of development and on the point of changing, adapting and renovating to provide better quality teaching.

One of the primary objectives is to adapt the European Higher Education Area (EHEA) to join the Bologna Process. In the academic year 2009/2010 six adapted degrees will be made available (Degrees in Biology, Environmental Science, Chemistry, Nursing, Physiotherapy and Social Work). 2010 will be a crucial year to complete the Bologna process and adapt the other qualifications. From then onwards they will consider creating new degrees, if deemed appropriate.

With the new EHEA guidelines the CAP or Teaching certificate will disappear to make way for the establishment of an official one year masters that will begin in the academic year 2009/2010.

Another big undertaking at the University of Jaén is the renovation, and construction of a new infrastructure. During the academic year 2009/2010 four new buildings will become available for use on Jaén Campus Lagunillas:

Animal Research Center or Animal Facility, behind the library, which will serve for testing and research with animals.
Building department for the Faculty of Humanities and Education, built on the site of the old school Candido Nogales. Remodelling of the existing departmental building of Humanities (D-2).
Research Center, next to the former building, which will host the Andalusian Center for Iberian Archaeology.
Multi-purpose building, which features a new dining hall, a VIP university restaurant, shops and a bank. The building is located between the Plaza de los Pueblos and the building B-5.
A complete renovation of the auditorium, located in Building C-1, and the reunification of the secretariats of the various faculties into one area in Building B-5 has also been undertaken.
Building for research support, innovation and employment, alongside the Animal Research Centre, where an office of the CADE (Andalusian Centre for Entrepreneurs) Office will be placed.

Traffic and lack of available access to the Campus Lagunillas in Jaen has been causing problems for years. For these reasons a comprehensive refurbishment of the entrances and the areas surrounding the Torrequebradilla road has been undertaken. In addition, parking areas will be removed in front of the vice-chancellor's office and next to the auditorium to pedestrianise them and 210 parking spaces will be created behind the building of the vice-chancellor's office. This will then create the campus enclosure, forming three separate controlled parking areas, with the current two next to the Torrequebradilla road and a new one in Ben Saprut street, building a new road to create access to it. On the other hand, this will create more spaces (the exact number is still unknown) which will be made after the construction of the building to support research, innovation and employment, alongside the Animal Research Centre. Another project is the improvement of public transport to the campus, with emphasis on the future Jaén tramstop, which iscurrently under construction.

Jaén council will grant planning permission to the university next to the future Sports Centre, opposite the current Campus Lagunillas. This land is fundamental to the growth of the university as the campus is already overcrowded.

On the 9th of April 2010 the Andalusian Council of Universities, this time chaired by the Andalusian president José Antonio Griñán, met at the University of Jaén in to approve new degrees in Andalusian universities. They also approved the establishment of the Faculty of Medicine in Jaén, the result of intense demands from society and institutions in Jaén, whose studies could begin teaching in 2012/2013. The building that will house this faculty will be established in the future Jaén Medical Village.

Another University infrastructure project is the construction of the Science and Technology Campus in Linares, which is situated in the proximity of the Mariano de la Paz sports centre, in the south of the city, which is where the Advanced Technical College of Linares will be relocated to.

Centres and departments 
The University of Jaén is divided into nine centres: three faculties, three colleges (one affiliated), two technical colleges and a research centre. In turn, there are 33 departments across which they have divided the teaching of the university.

Advanced Technical colleges 
 Jaén Advanced Technical College. Based in A3 and A4 buildings on the Campus Lagunillas. The A3 building is for the department of Engineering and Technology which houses the offices and laboratories of the school, while the A4 is the lecture hall building "Cesareo Rodriguez Aguilera" in which lectures are given. Both modern and avant-garde buildings replace the iconic "experts building" located in the city centre. The aforementioned building was demolished in 2005 and in its place an El Corte Inglesshopping centre was built .

 Linares Advanced Technical College. Linares Advanced Technical College, is located in Alfonso X "The Wise" Street. Departments corresponding to the Technical College of Linares are divided between two buildings, buildings 70 and 71. For many academic years up to 2005, the technical college of Linares shared the use of the building 70 with the School of Social Work. After years of demands on behalf of a range of Linares citizens and the university community, firm steps towards building a new University Campus in Linares seem to be being taken, where the Technical College of the city would be located.

Social Sciences Faculties 
 Faculty of Experimental Sciences
 Faculty of Social Sciences and Law
 Faculty of Humanities and Education

University Schools 
 School of Health Sciences
 School of Social Work. The School of Social Work is currently located in the Lagunillas Campus in Jaén, having been located in Linares since it was founded. This was an initiative of the municipal corporation of the town hall, until its controversial move, in 2005.
 Affiliated School of Education Holy Family in Úbeda. The School of Education Holy Family of Úbeda is a private school affiliated with the University of Jaén and entrusted to the Society of Jesus.

Auxiliary Research centres 
 Andalusian Centre for Iberian Archaeology
 Centre for Advanced Studies in Modern Languages

Lagunillas Campus 
The Lagunillas Campus is located in the north of the city of Jaén, situated between the main roads including Madrid Road, the Bailen-Motril A-road, the Torrequebradilla Road and Ben Saprut Avenue. This is where most of the teaching activities of the University of Jaén are carried out, and where the main administrative buildings are based.

The campus is divided into different buildings:
 A-1: Centre for Animal Experimentation and Animal Facilities
 A-2: Teaching labs and Technical research services
 A-3: Department of Engineering and Technology Building. The offices and laboratories of the Technical College in Jaén are located in this building, together with the lecture halls of the A-4. In September 2004 this replaced the iconic "experts building", located in Jaéncity centre near the old Victoria stadium.
 A-4: Lecture hall "Cesareo Rodriguez Aguilera
 B-1: Recorate
 B-2: Library
 B-3: Department of experimental science and health
 B-4: Lecture hall "Flores de Lemus"
 B-5: Lecture hall "Coello de Portugal and Quesada," where the secretariats of the faculties are currently located.
 C-1: Direction and management of schools, where the auditorium is located.
 C-2: Bachiller Pérez de Moya. The main student service offices are in this building, as well as a cafeteria and dining room.
 C-3: Lecture hall "Juan de Mata Carriazo"
 C-4: Services for the university. It is a multi-purpose building, which provides a large dining hall and various rooms which hosts several businesses (bookshop, beauty salon, travel agency, driving school, ...)
 C-5: Humanities Departmental
 C-6: Research centre
 D-1: Zabaleta building
 D-2: Humanities and Education, a former departmental building. It is one of the oldest buildings of the University, but it is kept in very good condition. Also right in front of this building is a small botanical garden with various species of exotic plants that further increase the number of green areas at the University of Jaén. They have a wide range of qualifications with high quality in teaching each of them. It is currently under construction, following the transfer of departments to the new building C-5.
 D-3'': Social Sciences and Law, departmental building, which houses the Departments of Public Law and Private Law Special (which encompasses the areas of Constitutional Law, Administrative Law, Labour Law, Commercial Law, Private International Law, History of Law and Political Science); the Criminal Law and Philosophy of Law, the Civil Law and Tax Law, the Department of Ecclesiastical, Litigation, Roman and Public International law, the Economics Department (home to Applied Economics, Basics of the history of economics), Department of Accounting and Finance, Department of Management, Marketing and Sociology. The Economic Affairs Department of the university is also temporarily located here.
 Plaza de los pueblos Vice-chancellors 
Since it was founded in 1997 Mr Luis Parras Guijosa was chosen as honourable vice-chancellor''' of the university, who held the position until 2007, after winning the elections held in 1999 and 2003. In the 2007elections, Mr Manuel Parras Rosa was declared the new vice-chancellor, which according to current regulations means Luis Parras is no longer eligible to run for the elections.

Honorary degrees 
Joaquín Ruiz-Giménez Cortés, 2001
 Manuel Valdivia Ureña, 2002
 Pedro Martínez Montávez, 2003
 Antonio Luque López, 2005
 Manuel Ortigueira Bouzada, 2007
 Tomás Ramón Fernández Rodríguez, 2007
Antonio Muñoz Molina, 2007
Gregorio Peces-Barba Martínez, 2008
 Baltasar Garzón Real, 2009
Joan Massagué Solé, 2010

Notable alumni 
Patricia Benavides (born 1969), Peruvian lawyer, attorney general of Peru

Transport 

Next to the Lagunillas University Campus, on the Madrid Road, there is a station on Line 1 of the Jaén Tram
In addition to the tram routes, several local bus routes from the city centre stop at Lagunillas Campus: 4, 7, 12, 14, 17, operated by local provider ALSA.

References

Sources
 Universidad of Jaén's yearbook 2009-2010

External links 
 Official Page of the University of Jaén
 University of Jaén in Universia
 Very illustrious and wandering University folk music group ("Tuna") of Jaén University District
 Very noble, very gentlemanly and very wandering folk music group ("Tuna") of Industrial Engineers of Jaén

Educational institutions established in 1993
Province of Jaén (Spain)
Jaen, University of
1993 establishments in Spain
Jaén, Spain
Universities and colleges in Spain